The Iningai (Yiningayi) were an indigenous Australian people of the present-day Longreach Region in the state of Queensland.

Country
The Iningai lay to the west of the Great Dividing Range as far as the Forsyth Range, Maneroo Creek, and Longreach. Norman Tindale estimated their territory as encompassing an area close to 19,500 sq. miles. Their southern frontier lay along the tributaries of the Alice River  down to the vicinity of Mexico. Their northern limits were at Muttaburra, Cornish Creek, Tower
Hill, Bowen Downs, and North Oakvale. They were also present at Aramac.

Muttaburra derives its name from one of the Iningai clan names.

Social organization
The Iningai were composed of several Band societyhordes, some of whose names survive:-
 Muttaburra.
 Tateburra. (north of Cornish Creek)
 Terreburra. (Alice River)

Alternative names
 Muttaburra. 
 Mutabura, Moothaburra, Mootaburra.
 Tateburra.
 Terreburra.
 Kana.

Notes

Citations

Sources

Aboriginal peoples of Queensland